The 1978 Romika Cup was a men's Grand Prix Tennis Circuit tournament held in Munich, West Germany. It was the 62nd edition of the tournament and was held from 23 May through 28 May 1978. It is now part of the ATP Tour. First-seeded Guillermo Vilas won the singles title, his second after 1975.

Finals

Singles

 Guillermo Vilas defeated  Buster Mottram 6–1, 6–3, 6–3
 It was Vilas's 2nd singles title of the year and the 37th of his career.

Doubles

 Ion Ţiriac /  Guillermo Vilas defeated  Jürgen Fassbender /  Tom Okker 3–6, 6–4, 7–6
 It was Tiriac's 1st title of the year and the 19th of his career. It was Vilas's 2nd title of the year and the 49th of his career.

References

External links 
 ATP – tournament profile
 ITF – tournament edition details
 Official website

Romika Cup
 
Bavarian International Tennis Championships
Romika Cup
Romika Cup